Anoka Primrose Pelpola Ekanayake Abeyrathne, also known as Anoka Abeyratne, is a Sri Lankan conservationist, award-winning social entrepreneur, and activist on sustainable development issues who served as the Asia-Pacific representative to UNHabitat YAB. She is the elected Environment Lead of the Royal Commonwealth Society.  In 2019, Abeyrathne appeared in the list of "Iconic Sri Lankan Women Who Have Shaped History".

Early life 
Abeyrathne completed her primary and secondary education in Biology at Bishop's College whilst excelling academically and in sports. Anoka grew up in the United Kingdom, Japan, India and Germany, to which she has attributed to her worldview. Instead of becoming a vetenerarian as initially intended, she opted to study law and business which later influenced her policy making. She gained experience working at the United Nations as well as the corporate sector whilst running a social enterprise. Having read for an undergraduate degree in law, she graduated with a master's degree from the Judge Business School of the University of Cambridge.

Activism and work 

When the 2004 tsunami struck Sri Lanka, Abeyrathne started volunteering to improve the local environment by planting Mangrove trees. She co-founded the organisation Sustain Solutions to run the Growin' Money Mangrove project. Growin' Money provided families the opportunity to gain an income through handicrafts, organic farming, and eco-tourism, along with offering access to education and skills training. The organization has replanted over 60,000 Mangroves in over 5 countries while training over 50000 women and youth over 10 years.

Anoka initiated Sri Lanka's most signed petition to revive and advocate for the stagnant Animal Welfare Bill with over 126,000 signatures from citizens and organisations concerned about animal welfare in Sri Lanka. This petition was handed over to the minister in charge to be tabled in Parliament. This inspired a trend of creating petitions for social causes in the country. For her work as an environmentalist and activism she was selected as a Global Changemaker in 2011.

Upon being sexually harassed on the streets of Colombo, Abeyrathne created a video of the incident which sparked nationwide outrage regarding the perpetrator, which resulted in the perpetrator being jailed for the crime. Abeyrathne's actions sparked a movement across the country of creating videos of sexual harassers, providing easier access for justice for many women and girls.

Abeyrathne has experience in the corporate, civil and government sectors having worked as an assistant director under the Government of Sri Lanka. She continues to support conservation and climate work, by empowering vulnerable communities. She recently stated that environmental advocacy cannot be only donor driven and must also listen to the needs of the community.

Awards and recognition

Abeyrathne was elected to lead the Environmental Working Group of the Royal Commonwealth Society - the first Sri Lankan to be accoladed. In 2020, she delivered the keynote address to mark the International Women's Day 2020 and rang the opening bell of the Colombo Stock Exchange. She is featured in the Cosmopolitan Magazine Sri Lanka's inaugural 35 under 35 list and is Sri Lanka's first female World Economic Forum New Champion. In 2019, Abeyrathne appeared in a list of "Iconic Sri Lankan Women Who Have Shaped History". She received the Commonwealth Youth Award and featured on the Forbes 30 under 30 list. She served as one of the 12 shapers on the United Nations–World Economic Forum Sustainable Development Council working towards mainstreaming sustainability, and is the first female New Champion of the World Economic Forum in Sri Lanka.  Abeyratne delivered the keynote speech at the Youth Leaders Forum, Commonwealth Asia Youth Ministers Meeting.  She was elected to the Asia-Pacific region to the UN Habitat Global Youth Advisory Board.

Being the youngest panelist on Sri Lanka's first Social Innovation Forum and the Commonwealth Women's Affairs Ministerial Meeting, she gave a keynote speech at the Youth Leaders Forum, Commonwealth Asia Region Youth Ministers Meeting 2015. Abeyrathne continues engagement in disaster management and sustainability analysis under the auspices of the Institute of National Security Studies Sri Lanka – Ministry of Defence (Sri Lanka).  Abeyrathne received a World Youth award in 2017 for her contribution to youth and sustainability and she was a British Council International Climate Champion.

References

External links
 

Sri Lankan women activists
Social entrepreneurs
Women in forestry
Women conservationists
Sri Lankan environmentalists
Sri Lankan women environmentalists
Living people
Sinhalese lawyers
Alumni of Bishop's College, Colombo
Year of birth missing (living people)